Stefan Kahil Lessard (born June 4, 1974) is an American musician, best known as the bassist for the Dave Matthews Band.

Early life
Lessard was born in Anaheim, California, to musicians Ron and Jacqueline Lessard. After moving a number of times during his childhood, Lessard and his family eventually settled in Charlottesville, Virginia in 1987. They had previously lived from 1980 to 1984 in Buckingham County, Virginia and in Richmond, Virginia from 1984 to 1986.

Career
After moving back to Charlottesville from Madison, Wisconsin in 1987, he enrolled in the Tandem Friends School, where he studied music under trumpeter John D'earth and bassist Peter Spaar. D'earth and Spaar recommended Lessard to Dave Matthews for inclusion in his new band, which was looking for a bassist. Lessard joined Dave Matthews Band just as it was forming, when he was sixteen years old. Due to his age, he sometimes had to sneak in the back door of the clubs where the band was playing due to prohibitions on persons under 21 entering venues that serve alcohol.

Lessard completed his junior year of high school and was accepted into the Jazz Studies program at Virginia Commonwealth University. He passed the GED examinations in the summer of 1991 in order to enter the program later that year. However, he withdrew after six weeks when it became evident that he could not pursue full-time college studies and simultaneously be a touring member of a band with rising popularity.

In 2006, Lessard began maintaining a MySpace page called LowenDude. He also owns and maintains a blog at izstyle.com. During the 2007 European Tour, Lessard also began a video blog on YouTube.

On January 9, 2008, Lessard performed with members of Guster and Barenaked Ladies under the name Yukon Kornelius in a benefit concert sponsored by Okemo Mountain Resort, a ski resort in Vermont. Later that year, he co-wrote the original music for Grand Canyon Adventure: River at Risk.

Personal life 
Lessard married long-time girlfriend Josie Baucom in 1997. They had one son together, Elijah "Diggy" Diego (born January 9, 1998) and lost a daughter, Aslan, to SIDS in 1996. They divorced in 2004.

In October 2005 he married Jaclyn Burton, and together they have three daughters, Hazel Bailey (born March 6, 2004), Flora Jude (born July 13, 2006), and India (born November 2015).

On November 29, 2007, Lessard's home in western Albemarle County, Virginia, burned down, with a loss estimated at over 2 million dollars. It took over 40 firefighters from five different fire departments to extinguish the blaze. The origin of the fire is unknown, but the Albemarle County Fire Marshal's Office cites the structure's cedar shake siding as a contributor to the rapid spread of the fire. Lessard and his son were home at the time of the fire, though they escaped unharmed.

Equipment
Lessard plays a variety of bass guitars, including those made by Nordstrand, Modulus, Warwick, Ken Smith Basses, and hand-made Stambaugh Custom Basses. On the Dave Matthews Band album Busted Stuff, he plays piano, Hammond organ, and Dobro guitar.

Bootleg Hunington Series
 1968 Fender P-Bass
 Thomastik-Infeld Power Bass Strings
 Ampeg SVT-2 and SVT-4 Pro Heads
 Ampeg 8x10 and 2x15 Bass Cabinets
 Furman PL-8 Power Conditioner
 Shure U4D-UB Wireless Units
 Eventide GTR-7000 Ultra-Harmonizer
 Whirlwind 4ch Multi Selector
 Korg DTR-1 Digital Tuner
 Rane SM26B Splitter/Mixer
Moog Taurus 3 Pedal

Solo discography
"Beautifully Broken" (featuring Stefan Lessard) (2001) – Gov't Mule's The Deep End, Vol. 1
"Burning Star" (featuring Stefan Lessard) (2012) – Pete Kilpatrick Band's Heavy Fire

References

Dave Matthews Band members
American rock bass guitarists
Guitarists from California
Guitarists from Virginia
1974 births
Living people
People from Anaheim, California
American jazz bass guitarists
American male bass guitarists
20th-century American guitarists
21st-century American guitarists
Jazz musicians from Virginia
21st-century American bass guitarists
American male jazz musicians
Jazz musicians from California